The 2003–04 FIBA Europe Cup was the second season of the  FIBA Europe Cup. After its first season the competition was now considered Europe's fourth level professional club basketball tournament. The season started on 5 November 2003, and ended on 28 March 2004. A total number of 41 teams participated in the competition.

Conference West

Qualifying round

Group A

Group B

Play-offs
The winner of the play-offs qualified for the FIBA EuroCup Final Four.

Conference East

Qualifying round

Group A

Group B

Group C

Group D

Play-offs
The winner of the play-offs qualified for the FIBA EuroCup Final Four.

Conference Central

Qualifying round

Group A

Group B

Group C

Play-offs
The winner of the play-offs qualified for the FIBA EuroCup Final Four.

Final Four MVP:  Wendell Alexis (Mitteldeutscher)

Conference South

Qualifying round

Group A

Group B

Group C

Group D

Play-offs
The winner of the play-offs qualified for the FIBA EuroCup Final Four.

Final Four
The pan-European Final Four was held in the İzmir Atatürk Sports Hall in İzmir. The semifinals were played on 27 March while the Final and third place game were played on 28 March 2017.

References

External links
2003–04 FIBA Europe Cup website

FIBA EuroCup Challenge
2003–04 in European basketball